Michael Paulsen (1 March 1899 – 18 October 1968) was a Norwegian football player. He was born in Kristiania, and played as a winger for Ørn-Horten. He was capped 20 times for Norwegian national team scoring one goal, and played at the Antwerp Olympics in 1920, where the Norwegian team reached the quarter finals. He died in Horten in 1968.

References

External links

1899 births
1968 deaths
People from Horten
Norwegian footballers
Norway international footballers
FK Ørn-Horten players
Footballers at the 1920 Summer Olympics
Olympic footballers of Norway
Association football midfielders
Sportspeople from Vestfold og Telemark